Savage River is a six-part Australian crime drama, produced by Aquarius Films, which premiered  on  ABC TV and  iview on 4 September 2022. Set in country Victoria, the series is led by director Jocelyn Moorhouse and cinematographer Don McAlpine, and stars Katherine Langford, Virginia Gay, Jacqueline McKenzie.

Synopsis
Miki Anderson who returns to her hometown in rural Victoria after ten years in prison, intending to get on with her life. However a murder is committed in the town, and the townspeople suspect Miki, and she sets out to prove her innocence.

Cast

 Katherine Langford as Miki Anderson
 Mark Coles Smith as Joel Thorpe
 Robert Grubb as Senior Sgt Bill Kirby
 Cooper Van Grootel as Terry Anderson
 Nadine Garner as Lynne Anderson
 Jacqueline McKenzie as Colleen Lang
 Jack Kenny as Adam Lang
 Daniel Henshall as Kevin Pattison
 Bernard Curry as Connor Kirby
 James Mackay as Simon Englert
 Richard Piper as Max Englert
 Andrew Gilbert as Hugh Lang
 Leah Vandenberg as Deborah Cochrane
 Amesh Edireweera as Ranil Perera
 Osamah Sami as Salim Bayati
 Maia Abbas as Jamila Bayati 
 Miranda Anwar as Chandra Pattison
 Rajan Velu as Sujan Nadesan
 Julian Weeks as Nick Healey
 Molly Grace as Jasmine Lang
 Ayesha Gibson as Taylah Russell
 Hattie Hook as Ivy Pattison
 Sally-Anne Upton as Dale O'Neil
 Benjamin Moore as Wayan Pattison
 Bev Killick as Brenda May
 Virginia Gay as Rachel Kennedy
 Hannah Bickerton as Ocean Anderson

Episodes

Production
The six-part series was directed by Jocelyn Moorhouse and is co-created by writers Belinda Bradley, Franz Docherty and lead writer Giula Sandler.

It was filmed in Melbourne, Warburton in the Yarra Valley, and in  Bright and | Myrtleford]] in the High Country of Victoria. Cinematography was by Don McAlpine.

It was produced by Angie Fielder and Polly Staniford of Aquarius Films for ABC Television. Funding was provided by Screen Australia with support from VicScreen through production investment and the Regional Location Assistance Fund.

Release
Savage River premiered  on  ABC TV and  iview on 4 September 2022.

Critical response
Travis Johnson, writing on Flicks, found the series too long to sustain interest. Emma Maguire found it a gripping example of the "Australian Gothic" genre: "When Miki gets a job at the abattoir we see a brutal reality: Savage River is a town built on blood and slaughter, a truth that references the colonial violence at the foundation of modern Australia".

References

External links 
  

2022 Australian television series debuts
Television shows set in Victoria (Australia)
Australian Broadcasting Corporation original programming
English-language television shows